Johannes Falnes (born 15 December 1931) is a Professor Emeritus of Experimental Physics at the Department of Physics of the Norwegian University of Science and Technology noted for his contributions to wave energy research. He is one of the pioneers of modern wave energy research.

Education
Falnes received his master's and doctoral degrees both from the Norwegian Institute of Technology.

Career
Falnes spent his career at the Norwegian Institute of Technology (1956–1959), CERN (1959–1961), the University of Bergen (1961–1964), the Norwegian Institute of Technology/Norwegian University of Science and Technology (1965–2001), and SINTEF (1966–1972), before retiring in 2002. He is, however, still professionally active.

Falnes' main research interest has been ocean wave energy and its utilisation. Together with Kjell Budal, he initiated wave energy research in Norway in the 1970s. Falnes and Budal discovered the so-called antenna effect, where a floating point absorber could theoretically absorb far more wave energy from the sea than that which is directly incident upon its geometry, analogous to a radio antenna's ability to absorb radio waves. They also developed the latching control strategy to maximize energy extraction.

In December 2006, a seminar titled Challenges for Wave Energy Technology was dedicated in tribute to Falnes on his 75th anniversary. The seminar was held in Trondheim, Norway. Wave energy experts such as Stephen Salter (University of Edinburgh), António Falcão (Instituto Superior Técnico), Alain Clément (École centrale de Nantes), and Richard Yemm (Ocean Power Delivery) addressed various topics in the seminar.

Falnes is a member of The Royal Norwegian Society of Sciences and Letters and the Norwegian Academy of Technological Sciences.

Personal life
Among his pastimes are hiking and cross-country skiing.

Selected publications

References

External links 

1931 births
People associated with CERN
Living people
Members of the Norwegian Academy of Technological Sciences
Norwegian Institute of Technology alumni
Academic staff of the Norwegian Institute of Technology
Academic staff of the Norwegian University of Science and Technology
Norwegian physicists
Royal Norwegian Society of Sciences and Letters
Academic staff of the University of Bergen